Maltseva is a rural locality (a village) in Beloyevskoye Rural Settlement, Kudymkarsky District, Perm Krai, Russia. The population was 211 as of 2010. There are 8 streets.

Geography 
Maltseva is located 30 km northwest of Kudymkar (the district's administrative centre) by road. Kiprusheva is the nearest rural locality.

References 

Rural localities in Kudymkarsky District